The following is a list of fictional astronauts exploring the outer Solar System.

Jupiter

Saturn

Uranus

Neptune

Notes

See also
 List of fictional astronauts (miscellaneous futuristic activities)

References

Lists of fictional astronauts